Beringraja rhina, commonly known as the longnose skate, is a species of skate in the family Rajidae from the northeast Pacific. It is found from the eastern   Bering Sea and Alaska to Baja California and the Gulf of California.
The longnose skate has only recently been associated with the genus Beringraja, having been previously included in Raja until genetic evidence supported reclassification. This issue has not be completely resolved and the scientific name "Raja rhina" is still in widespread use.

Description
The longnose skate has an elongated snout and deeply notched pelvic fins. Maximum age has been estimated as 25 years in Gulf of Alaska and 26 years in British Columbia. The age estimates are based on counting growth bands in vertebrae, a method which has been validated using bomb radiocarbon.

Distribution and habitat
In a recent study published in August 2019, researchers found that this nearshore species tends to dwell in the upper continental slope in highly sedimented areas, and also in association with rock out crops, authigenic carbonate crust, and mixed substrate areas in depths between 200-929 m. Longnoses inhabited areas with 3–6 °C temperatures. This research came from the first long-scale, long-term assessment of skates in deepwater of the eastern North Pacific.

Reproduction
The longnose skates egg case is large and smooth, and has large webbed keels on its posterior and anterior margins.

References

longnose skate
Western North American coastal fauna
longnose skate